Jeremy Hansen (born ) is an Australian entrepreneur, publicist and socialite.

Hansen was recognised as one of the top entrepreneurs in Australia by Anthill Magazine in 2013 and 2014 and by Virgin Australia.

Career
Hansen is the founder and director of the public relations firm GlowBored and the creative talent management company The Talent Assembly. GlowBored was launched in 2012 after Hansen dropped out of high school at age 15. In 2014 Hansen launched The Talent Assembly, set up as a partner company to GlowBored, to manage/represent Australian entertainment personalities and socialite bloggers.

References

External links
Official website
GlowBored
The Talent Assembly

Living people
Year of birth missing (living people)
Australian businesspeople